The Riley H. Andes House is a historic house in Sevierville, Tennessee, U.S..

History
The house was built in 1867 for Riley H. Andes, his wife, Rebecca Rimel, and their daughter Sallie. The Italianate and Queen Anne woodcarving was designed by Lewis Buckner, an African-American carpenter, in 1890. After Riley Andes's death in 1917, their daughter Sallie, who was married to J. W. Trotter, rented the house, until she sold it to John Denton in 1942. It is now home to the Robert A. Tino Gallery, named after a local painter.

The house has been listed on the National Register of Historic Places since July 8, 1980.

References

Houses on the National Register of Historic Places in Tennessee
Houses completed in 1867
Houses in Sevier County, Tennessee
Queen Anne architecture in Tennessee
1867 establishments in Tennessee